The 15th Dáil was elected at the 1954 general election on 14 May 1954 and met on 2 June 1954. The members of Dáil Éireann, the house of representatives of the Oireachtas (legislature), of Ireland are known as TDs. On 12 February 1957, President Seán T. O'Kelly dissolved the Dáil at the request of the Taoiseach John A. Costello on 4 February. The 15th Dáil lasted  days.

Composition of the 15th Dáil

Fine Gael, the Labour Party, and Clann na Talmhan, denoted with bullets, formed the 7th Government of Ireland, a minority government dependent on the support of Clann na Poblachta.

Graphical representation
This is a graphical comparison of party strengths in the 15th Dáil from June 1954. This was not the official seating plan.

Ceann Comhairle
On the meeting of the Dáil, Patrick Hogan (Lab), who had served as Ceann Comhairle in the previous Dáil, was proposed by Éamon de Valera (FF) and seconded by Richard Mulcahy (FG) for the position. His election was approved without a vote. Hogan had served as Leas-Cheann Comhairle from 1927 to 1928, from 1932 to 1938 and from 1948 to 1951.

TDs by constituency
The list of the 147 TDs elected is given in alphabetical order by Dáil constituency.

Changes

See also
Members of the 8th Seanad

References

External links
Houses of the Oireachtas: Debates: 15th Dáil

 
15
15th Dáil